The Peresopnytsia Gospel (Peresopnytske Yevanheliie), dating from the 16th century, is one of the most intricate surviving East Slavic manuscripts. It was made between 15 August 1556 and 29 August 1561, at the Monastery of the Holy Trinity in Iziaslav, and the Monastery of the Mother of God in Peresopnytsia, Volyn'. The scribe was Mykhailo Vasyl’ovych, son of an archpriest from Sianik, who worked under the direction of Hryhorii, the archimandrite of the Peresopnytsia Monastery. 

The manuscript is a Gospel Book containing only the four Gospels of the New Testament, and is ornamented with Glagolitic characters, which were influenced by the Italian Renaissance style. This is the first known example of a vernacular Old Ukrainian translation of the canonical text of the Scriptures.

The Peresopnytsya Gospels are the best-known translations of canonical texts into the Old Ukrainian language.  Luxuriously decorated under the influence of the Italian Renaissance, the work also shows characteristic Ukrainian decorations, and a high artistic level in the miniatures of the Ukrainian icon-painting school connected with Byzantine and Eastern Slavonic traditions. 

The Peresopnytsya Gospels were commissioned by Princess Nastacia Yuriyivna Zheslavska-Holshanska (Zaslavska-Olshanska) of Volyn, and her daughter and her son-in-law (Yevdokiya and Ivan Fedorovych Czartoryski).

After its completion, the book was kept in the Peresopnytsya Monastery. On 17 April 1701 it was presented to Pereyaslav Cathedral by Ivan Mazepa the Hetman of Ukraine. Scholar Osip Bodyansky discovered the book at the Pereyaslav Seminary and published a paper on the subject. Later on it was held in the Poltava Seminary, Poltava Museum of History and Regional Studies, Kyiv Pechersk Lavra preserve. On 24 December 1948 this treasure of Ukrainian culture was placed at the Vernadsky National Library of Ukraine.

All six Ukrainian Presidents since 1991 have taken the oath of office on the Gospels: Leonid Kravchuk (1991), Leonid Kuchma (1994), Viktor Yushchenko (2005), Viktor Yanukovych (2010), Petro Poroshenko (2014), and Volodymyr Zelensky (2019). 

On November 9, 2010, on the Day of Ukrainian Writing and Language, ADEF-Ukraine publishing house presented the Peresopnytske Evangelie edition. Origins and present. The book contains reduced facsimile copies of images of the original texts, the original text transliterated into the modern Ukrainian Cyrillic alphabet (with the addition of a little more than ten letters from the Church Slavonic Cyrillic alphabet) and a translation of the Peresopnytskyi Gospel into modern Ukrainian.

See also
 Bible translations into Ukrainian

References

External links

 Peresopnytsia Gospel at the Encyclopedia of Ukraine
 Information on the Peresopnytsia Gospel from UNESCO
 Role of the Gospel in Ukrainian inaugurations
 Peresopnytsya Gospel Treasure of the National Library of Ukraine, displayed via The European Library
 Copy of Peresopnytsia Gospel Passed to Vatican
 Information on a Peresopnytsia Gospel commemorative stamp

East Slavic manuscripts
Gospel Books
Ukrainian culture
16th-century biblical manuscripts
History of Christianity in Ukraine
16th-century illuminated manuscripts
National symbols of Ukraine
Ukrainian presidential inaugurations
Bible translations into Ukrainian
Cyrillic manuscripts
Early printed Bibles